Latin Christian music (Spanish Musica Cristiana Latina) is a subgenre of Latin music and Contemporary Christian music. Christian music is well established in Latin America's Evangelical churches, but is also popular with the major Roman Catholic community. Both the Latin Grammy Awards and Latin Billboard Music Awards have Christian music categories,   (e.g. Latin Grammy Award for Best Christian Album (Spanish Language)), though the markets are often underestimated due to low reporting.

Latin American artists

Notable artists include Brazilian singers Ana Paula Valadão and Aline Barros, Panamanian musician Santiago Stevenson (d. 2007), Jaime Murrell, Luis "Funky" Marrero, Puerto Rican rapper in the genre of hip-hop, reggaeton, and Christian contemporary music, Willy Redimi2 González Dominican rapper in Latin hip-hop, trap, and Christian contemporary music, Venezuelan pop singer José Luis Rodríguez, Daniel Calveti and Christian Sebastia, Mexican singers/pastors Jesús Adrián Romero, Marcos Witt, and Armando Flores, and singers Alejandro Alonso (musician), Marco Barrientos, Ecuador's Paulina Aguirre, Salvadorian Álvaro Torres, Colombia's Alex Campos and Ericson Molano, and Mexican band Rojo. Other artists include Samuel Hernández, Roberto Orellana, Annette Moreno, and Christian singers like Daniela G Mangrum.

American Latin artists
US artists include Texas-based singers Jaci Velasquez and Omar Salas, New Jersey-born musician Anthony Rodriguez and New York-born Christian pop artist Jon Montalban.

In Europe
Spain and Portugal also have their own local Christian music artists. Notable in Portugal is Catholic minister Padre José Luis Borga.

References

Latin American music
Christian music
Spanish-language music
Lusophone music
Latin music genres